is the third indie single released by Japanese pop rock band Scandal. It was limited to 2,000 copies, came in a CD+DVD format only, and was exclusive to Tower Records in Japan. It was sold on Scandal's United States tour. The single reached #122 on the Oricon weekly chart and charted for one week, selling 586 copies.

Track listing

CD

DVD

References 

2008 singles
Scandal (Japanese band) songs
Songs written by Tomomi Ogawa